Laural Barrett (born 18 December 1986) is a New Zealand model, singer and beauty queen who was an entrant in Miss Universe 2007 as the winner of the Miss New Zealand contest. She has also appeared in the New Zealand reality TV show Island Wars.

Personal

Barrett was born in Christchurch to Neville and Niki Barrett, with sisters Kristal and Sharaine, her twin.  Laural and Sharaine used to sing together under the name "Gemini Twinz."  Barrett married actor/musician Mark Furze in Las Vegas in 2015.

References

1986 births
Living people
Miss Universe 2007 contestants